In mathematics, the Hilbert symbol or norm-residue symbol is a function (–, –) from K× × K× to the group of nth roots of unity in a local field K such as the fields of reals or p-adic numbers . It is related to reciprocity laws, and can be defined in terms of the Artin symbol of local class field theory.

The Hilbert symbol has been generalized to higher local fields.

Quadratic Hilbert symbol

Over a local field K whose multiplicative group of non-zero elements is K×,
the quadratic Hilbert symbol is the function (–, –) from K× × K× to {−1,1} defined by

Equivalently,  if and only if  is equal to the norm of an element of the quadratic extension  page 110.

Properties
The following three properties follow directly from the definition, by choosing suitable solutions of the diophantine equation above:
If a is a square, then (a, b) = 1 for all b.
For all a,b in K×,  (a, b) = (b, a).
For any a in K× such that a−1 is also in K×, we have (a, 1−a) = 1.
The (bi)multiplicativity, i.e.,
(a, b1b2) = (a, b1)·(a, b2)
for any a, b1 and b2 in K× is, however, more difficult to prove, and requires the development of local class field theory.

The third property shows that the Hilbert symbol is an example of a Steinberg symbol and thus factors over the second Milnor K-group , which is by definition
K× ⊗ K× / (a ⊗ (1−a), a ∈ K× \ {1})
This is the first step towards the Milnor conjecture.

Interpretation as an algebra

In this case the algebra represents an element of order 2 in the Brauer group of K, which is identified with -1 if it is a division algebra and +1 if it is isomorphic to the algebra of 2 by 2 matrices.

Hilbert symbols over the rationals
For a place v of the rational number field and rational numbers a, b we let (a, b)v denote the value of the Hilbert symbol in the corresponding completion Qv. As usual, if v is the valuation attached to a prime number p then the corresponding completion is the p-adic field and if v is the infinite place then the completion is the real number field.

Over the reals, (a, b)∞ is +1 if at least one of a or b is positive, and −1 if both are negative.

, where 

and the expression involves two Legendre symbols.

, where 

It is known that if v ranges over all places, (a, b)v is 1 for almost all places. Therefore, the following product formula

makes sense. It is equivalent to the law of quadratic reciprocity.

Kaplansky radical
The Hilbert symbol on a field F defines a map

where Br(F) is the Brauer group of F.  The kernel of this mapping, the elements a such that (a,b)=1 for all b, is the Kaplansky radical of F.

The radical is a subgroup of F*/F*2, identified with a subgroup of F*.  The radical is equal to F* if and only if F has u-invariant at most 2.  In the opposite direction, a field with radical F*2 is termed a Hilbert field.

The general Hilbert symbol

If K is a local field containing the group of nth roots of unity for some positive integer n prime to the characteristic of K, then the Hilbert symbol is a function from K*×K* to μn.  In terms of the Artin symbol it can be defined by

Hilbert originally defined the Hilbert symbol before the Artin symbol was discovered, and his definition (for n prime) used the power residue symbol when K has residue characteristic coprime to n, and was rather complicated when K has residue characteristic dividing n.

Properties

The Hilbert symbol is (multiplicatively) bilinear:
(ab,c) = (a,c)(b,c)
(a,bc) = (a,b)(a,c)
skew symmetric:
(a,b) = (b,a)−1
nondegenerate:
 (a,b)=1 for all b if and only if a is in K*n
It detects norms (hence the name norm residue symbol):
(a,b)=1 if and only if a is a norm of an element in K()
It has the "symbol" properties:
(a,1–a)=1, (a,–a)=1.

Hilbert's reciprocity law

Hilbert's reciprocity law states that if a and b are in an algebraic number field containing the nth roots of unity then

where the product is over the finite and infinite primes p of the number field, and wherep is the Hilbert symbol of the completion at p. Hilbert's reciprocity law follows from the Artin reciprocity law and the definition of the Hilbert symbol in terms of the Artin symbol.

Power residue symbol

If K is a number field containing the nth roots of unity, p is a prime ideal not dividing n, π is a prime element of the local field of p, and a is coprime to p, then the power residue symbol is related to the Hilbert symbol by

The power residue symbol is extended to fractional ideals by multiplicativity, and defined for elements of the number field
by putting=() where (b) is the principal ideal generated by b.
Hilbert's reciprocity law then implies the following reciprocity law for the residue symbol, for a and b prime to each other and to n:

See also 

 Azumaya algebra

External links

HilbertSymbol at Mathworld

References

 
 
 
 
 

Class field theory
Quadratic forms
David Hilbert